Kvitøyjøkulen is a large icecap on the island of Kvitøya in the Svalbard archipelago. The icecap covers most of the island, which has an area between 600 and 700 square kilometers.

References

Glaciers of Svalbard
Kvitøya